Ammonius Hermiae (– between 517 and 526) was a Greek philosopher from Alexandria in the eastern Roman empire during Late Antiquity. A Neoplatonist, he was the son of the philosophers Hermias and Aedesia, the brother of Heliodorus of Alexandria and the grandson of Syrianus. Ammonius was a pupil of Proclus in Roman Athens, and taught at Alexandria for most of his life, having obtained a public chair in the 470s.

According to Olympiodorus of Thebes's Commentaries on Plato's Gorgias and Phaedo texts, Ammonius gave lectures on the works of Plato, Aristotle, and Porphyry of Tyre, and wrote commentaries on Aristotelian works and three lost commentaries on Platonic texts. He is also the author of a text on the astrolabe published in the Catalogus Codicum Astrologorum Graecorum, and lectured on astronomy and geometry. Ammonius taught numerous Neoplatonists, including Damascius, Olympiodorus of Thebes, John Philoponus, Simplicius of Cilicia, and Asclepius of Tralles. Also among his pupils were the physician Gessius of Petra and the ecclesiastical historian Zacharias Rhetor, who became the bishop of Mytilene.

As part of the persecution of pagans in the late Roman Empire, the Alexandrian school was investigated by the Roman imperial authorities; Ammonius made a compromise with the Patriarch of Alexandria, Peter III, voluntarily limiting his teaching in return for keeping his own position. This alienated a number of his colleagues and pupils, including Damascius, who nonetheless called him "the greatest commentator who ever lived" in his own Life of Isidore of Alexandria.

Life
Ammonius' father Hermias died when he was a child, and his mother Aedesia raised him and his brother Heliodorus in Alexandria. When they reached adulthood, Aedesia accompanied her sons to Athens where they studied under Proclus. Eventually, they returned to Alexandria where Ammonius, as head of the Neoplatonist school in the city, lectured on Plato and Aristotle for the rest of his life. According to Damascius, during the persecution of the pagans at Alexandria in the late 480s, Ammonius made concessions to the Christian authorities so that he could continue his lectures. Damascius, who scolds Ammonius for the agreement that he made, does not say what the concessions were, but it may have involved limitations on the doctrines he could teach or promote. He was still teaching in 515; Olympiodorus heard him lecture on Plato's Gorgias in that year. He was also an accomplished astronomer; he lectured on Ptolemy and is known to have written a treatise on the astrolabe.

Writings

Of his reputedly numerous writings, only his commentary on Aristotle's De Interpretatione survives intact. A commentary on Porphyry's Isagoge may also be his, but it is somewhat corrupt and contains later interpolations.

In De Interpretatione, Ammonius contends that divine foreknowledge makes void the contingent. Like Boethius in his second Commentary and in The Consolation of Philosophy, this argument maintains the effectiveness of prayer. Ammonius cites Iamblichus, who said "knowledge is intermediate between the knower and the known, since it is the activity of the knower concerning the known."

In addition, there are some notes of Ammonius' lectures written by various students which also survive:

On Aristotle's Categories (anonymous writer)
On Aristotle's Prior Analytics I (anonymous writer)
On Aristotle's Metaphysics 1–7 (written by Asclepius)
On Nicomachus' Introduction to Arithmetic (written by Asclepius)
On Aristotle's Prior Analytics (written by John Philoponus)
On Aristotle's Posterior Analytics (written by John Philoponus)
On Aristotle's On Generation and Corruption (written by John Philoponus)
On Aristotle's On the Soul (written by John Philoponus)

There is Greek-language work called Life of Aristotle, which is usually ascribed to Ammonius, but "is more probable that it is the work of Joannes Philoponus, the pupil of Ammonius, to whom it is ascribed in some MSS."

English translations
Ammonius: On Aristotle Categories, translated by S. M. Cohen and G. B. Matthews. London and Ithaca 1992.
Ammonius: On Aristotle's On Interpretation 1–8, translated by D. Blank. London and Ithaca 1996.
Ammonius: On Aristotle's On Interpretation 9, with Boethius: On Aristotle's On Interpretation 9, translated by D. Blank (Ammonius) and N. Kretzmann (Boethius). London and Ithaca 1998
John Philoponus: On Aristotle On Coming-to-be and Perishing 1.1–5, translated by C. J. F. Williams. London and Ithaca 1999
John Philoponus: On Aristotle On Coming-to-be and Perishing 1.6–2.4, translated by C. J. F. Williams. London and Ithaca 1999.
John Philoponus: On Aristotle On the Soul 2.1–6, translated by W. Charlton. London and Ithaca 2005
John Philoponus: On Aristotle On the Soul 2.7–12, translated by W. Charlton. London and Ithaca 2005
John Philoponus: On Aristotle On the Soul 3.1–8, translated by W. Charlton. London and Ithaca 2000
John Philoponus: On Aristotle On the Intellect (de Anima 3.4–8), translated by W. Charlton. London and Ithaca 1991.

Notes

References
 Andron, Cosmin. "Ammonios of Alexandria",The Routledge Encyclopedia of Ancient Natural Scientists, eds. Georgia Irby-Massie and Paul T. Keyser, New York: Routledge, 2008.
 Jones, A., Martindale, J., Morris, J. The Prosopography of the Later Roman Empire, Cambridge: Cambridge University Press, 1992, pages 71–72. 
 Karamanolis, George E. Plato and Aristotle in agreement? : Platonists on Aristotle from Antiochus to Porphyry, New York : Oxford University Press, 2006.
 
 Seel, Gerhard (ed.), Ammonius and the Seabattle. Texts, Commentary, and Essays, in collaboration with Jean-Pierre Schneider and Daniel Schulthess ; Ammonius on Aristotle: De interpretatione 9 (and 7, 1–17) Greek text established by A. Busse, philosophical commentary by Gerhard Seel; essays by Mario Mignucci and Gerhard Seel, Berlin: Walter de Gruyter, 2001.
 Sorabji, Richard. The Philosophy of the Commentators, 200–600 AD. A Sourcebook, Ithaca: Cornell University Press, 2005.
 Verrycken, Koenraad. The Metaphysics of Ammonius son of Hermias, in Richard Sorabji (ed.), Aristotle Transformed. The Ancient Commentators and their Influence, Ithaca: Cornell University Press, 1990, p. 199-231.

External links

Commentaria in Aristotelem Graeca, Vol. 4 parts 2–6, Akademie der Wissenschaften, Berlin, Edita consilio et auctoritate Academiae litterarum regiae borussicae (1882).

5th-century philosophers
6th-century philosophers
Commentators on Aristotle
Commentators on Plato
Roman-era students in Athens
Neoplatonists
Ancient Roman philosophers
440s births
520s deaths
5th-century Byzantine writers
6th-century Byzantine writers
5th-century astronomers
6th-century astronomers
5th-century Byzantine scientists
6th-century Byzantine scientists
5th-century mathematicians
6th-century mathematicians
Byzantine astronomers
People from Alexandria